Martino Traversa (born 1960) is a composer of classical, electronic and electroacoustic music.

Martino Traversa has studied piano, composition, electronic music and Information Technology. He graduated in Improvisation Technique at the "Accademia di Alto Perfezionamento" in Pescara. He attended to 3-yearly summer courses in Siena. Has studied at Salzburg's Mozarteum and at CCRMA (Center for Computer Research in Music and Acoustic) at Stanford University.
 
He studied with Luigi Nono from 1987 to 1989. In 1990, he founded and managed Ensemble Edgard Varèse, with Luigi Nono's support. In 1991, he launched "Traiettorie", an international festival of modern and contemporary music. In 1999, Martino Traversa founded the Prometeo Foundation, a resident laboratory of cultural activities, related to physiques, arts and philosophy.

He regularly composes and researches the field of electronics applied to musical acoustic. Martino Traversa is professor of music at the University of Parma.

Selected Compositions 
 Octeur
 4d
 Bianco, ma non troppo
 Rimane l'eco
 Manhattan Bridge
 Come un suono, dal suono del mondo
 Dopo il respiro
 Landscape
 Quadrato bianco, su sfondo bianco

Selected Compositions - Electroacoustic music
 Bianco, ma non troppo
 Quartetto per viola sola
 Fragment 1, for alto and live electronic
 Fragment 2, for sax and live electronic

Selected Compositions - Electronic music 
 Poeme electronique
 Bianco
 Variazioni sopra un labirinto
 Critical_Path
 Esclepion
 NGC 253

References
 Music and Science: An Interview with Martino Traversa. Computer Music Journal: Vol. 20, No, 3. Cambridge, MA: MIT Press: 14-19.
 http://www.ears.dmu.ac.uk/spip.php?page=artBiblio&id_article=1672

External links
 Neos https://neos-music.com/

1960 births
Living people
Italian composers
Italian male composers